Johnstone railway station serves the town of Johnstone, Renfrewshire, Scotland. Johnstone has no ticket gates but ticket checks take place occasionally.

History 
The station was opened on 21 July 1840 by the Glasgow, Paisley, Kilmarnock and Ayr Railway. The station was renamed Johnstone High on 18 June 1955, however its original name was restored on 10 September 1962. Just to the east of the station there was a junction connecting to the Bridge of Weir Railway.

In the 1960s it was the location of a car loading facility for vehicles manufactured at the Linwood Car Plant.

Facilities 
The station has one of ten remaining ticket offices on the Ayrshire Coast Line, and a Scheidt & Bachmann Ticket XPress self-service ticket machine was installed on Platform 1 in 2007.  Both platforms are accessible to wheelchair users, and seven of the 282 spaces in the car park are allocated to disabled drivers.

Services

1980 
Monday to Friday there were two trains per hour to Ayr (one being limited stop), some of which were extended to Girvan and Stranraer Harbour. There was one train per hour to Largs. Additional trains ran to Ardrossan Winton Pier to connect with the ferry to Brodick.

2013 
Monday to Saturday daytimes, four trains per hour go eastbound to Glasgow Central.

2016 
The Glasgow service remains unchanged from 2013, but there are now 2tph through to Ayr in addition to the hourly trains to Ardrossan Harbour & Largs.  On Sundays, there are 2tph to Ayr and hourly trains to Largs, with 3tph to Glasgow.

References

Notes

Sources 

 
 

Railway stations in Renfrewshire
Former Glasgow and South Western Railway stations
Railway stations in Great Britain opened in 1840
Railway stations served by ScotRail
SPT railway stations
Johnstone